Byeolmuban is the name of a special army unit in the time of Korea's Goryeo Dynasty (918–1392). The word byeol literally means star, but also has the meaning of special. Founding of the army was initiated by Yun Gwan during the reign of king Sukjong of Goryeo.

The army was put together to fight the Jurchen who were putting pressure on Goryeo's northern borders. The Goryeo infantry had a hard time resisting the strong Jurchen cavalry.

Organization

The Byeolmuban army had six divisions: Yun Gwan's regular army and Armor Guards called Jeonggyugun (정규군, 正規軍) Infantry called Sinbogun (신보군, 神步軍), Cavalry called Sin-gigun (신기군, 神騎軍), an army of Buddhist monks called Hangmagun (항마군, 降魔軍), Supporting troop made of slaves called Yeonhogun (연호군,烟戶軍), and volunteered soldiers made of merchants and ordinary citizens called Jubugunhyeon (주부군현, 州府郡縣). 

Combating troops were divided into Assassin/Spies called Sinbo (신보, 神步), Siege Engineers called Dotang (도탕, 跳蕩), Archers called Gyeonggung (경궁, 梗弓), Builders called Jeongno (정노, 精弩), Ballistic/Cannon gunners called Balhwa (발화, 發火), and special force called Teugibudae (특기부대, 特技部隊). They were to be trained and maintain/make weapons & fight with regular army.

During the second year of king Yejong of Goryeo's reign the byeomuban, consisting of 17,000 soldiers, attacked Jurchen and killed approximately 5,000 Jurchen troops, detained another 5,000 POWs and 350 Jurchen tribal clans and took over their territory by building nine fortresses at Hamju region.

Fortresses were called Northeastern Nine Fortresses, and they are in Hamju (함주, 咸州), Yeongju (영주, 英州), Ungju (웅주, 雄州), Bokju (복주, 福州), Gilju (길주, 吉州), Gongheomjin, (공험진, 公咽鎭), Sungnyeong (숭녕, 崇寧), Tongtae (통태, 通泰), and Jinyang (진양, 眞陽).

However internal trouble at the Goryeo court later forced the Goryeo army to leave Jurchen territory just after few years.

References

별무반 (別武班) - https://web.archive.org/web/20070327072129/http://mtcha.com.ne.kr/korea-term/goryo/term67-byulmuban.htm

Military history of Korea